Halford is an unincorporated community in Thomas County, Kansas, United States.

History
Halford had a post office from 1892 until 1953.

References

Further reading

External links
 Thomas County maps: Current, Historic, KDOT

Unincorporated communities in Thomas County, Kansas
Unincorporated communities in Kansas